Ruth Kark (born 1941) is an Israeli historical geographer and professor of geography at the Hebrew University of Jerusalem. Professor Kark is a well-known researcher and expert in the field of the historical geography of Palestine and Israel.

Biography

Early life and education 
Ruth Kark (née Kleiner) was born in Herzliya in 1941 to Shoshana Moczan and Avraham Kleiner.

Kark completed her B.A. at the Hebrew University of Jerusalem in 1964, was awarded an MA in 1972 and earned her doctorate in 1977. Kark's PhD thesis was on The Development of the Cities Jerusalem and Jaffa from 1840 up to the First World War (A Study in Historical Geography).

Personal life 
Kark was married to Jeremy David Kark, with whom she had three children.

Academic career
Kark has written and edited more than 20 books and over 250 peer-reviewed articles on the history and historical geography of Palestine and Israel. Kark is noted for her work on settlement in the Land of Israel in the 19th-century and Western influences on the Holy Land. More recently, she has published works about women and land ownership in both traditional and modern cultures across the Middle East. Kark is often brought into court hearings in Israel as an expert on land disputes and as an academic with a reputation in the field of pre-State landownership in Israel.

Published works

Books
 Kark, R., Frontier Jewish Settlement in the Negev, 1880–1948. Tel Aviv: Ha-Kibbutz Ha-Muchad Publishers, 1974. 204 pp. (in Hebrew).
Kark, R., Neighborhoods in Jerusalem—Building in New Jerusalem and Neighborhoods By-Laws. Jerusalem: Yad Izhak Ben-Zvi Publications, 1978. 88 pp. (in Hebrew).
Kark, R., Jaffa—A City in Evolution, 1799–1917. Jerusalem: Yad Izhak Ben-Zvi, 1984. 300 pp. (in Hebrew).
Kark, R., Jerusalem Neighborhoods, Planning and By-Laws (1855–1930). Jerusalem: Magnes Press, 1991. 195 pp.
Glass J. B. and Kark, R., Sephardi Entrepreneurs in Eretz Israel—The Amzalak Family, 1816–1918. Jerusalem: Magnes Press, 1991. 202 pp.
Kark, R., American Consuls in the Holy Land 1832–1914. Detroit: Wayne State University Press; Jerusalem: Magnes Press, 1994. 395 pp. 
Kark, R. and Oren-Nordheim M., Jerusalem and Its Environs—Quarters, Neighborhoods and Villages 1800–1948. Jerusalem: Academon Publishing House, 1995. 528 pp. (in Hebrew).
Amit, I. and Kark, R., Yehoshua Hankin. Tel Aviv: Milo, 1996. 334 pp. (in Hebrew).
Dudman, H. and Kark, R., The American Colony, Scenes from a Jerusalem Saga. Jerusalem: Carta, 1998, 303 pp.
Kark-Kleiner, R. The Pioneering Observation Posts in the Negev. Jerusalem:  Ariel Publishing, Jerusalem, 2002 (Hebrew).
Kark, R. and Glass, J. B., Seven Generations in Jerusalem: The Valero Family, 1800-1948. Gefen Publishing House, Jerusalem and New York, 2005 (Hebrew), 334 pp.
Perry, N. and Kark, R., Ethnographic Museums in Israel, Jerusalem: Ariel Publishing, Jerusalem, 2014 (Hebrew) and English, Israel Academic Press (2017).
Galilee, E. and Kark, R., The Valley of Yizrael/Marj Ibn Amarat the end of the Ottoman Period, Hebrew & English, Israel Academic Press, New York, 2017.
Slae, B. and Kark, R., Jerusalem’s Jewish Quarter: Heritage and Post War Restoration, Israel Academic Press and Amazon, New York, 2018.
 Galilee, E. and Kark, R., Transformation of the Jezreel Valley: Marj Ibn 'Amer in the late Ottoman Period , Israel Academic Press, 2018.

Edited books
 Ben-Arieh, Y. and Kark, R., eds. Israel Studies in Historical Geography. A Book Series. Jerusalem: Magnes Press (five volumes, 1989–1997; four of the volumes in press).
Kark, R., ed. The Land that Became Israel. Studies in Historical Geography. Jerusalem: Magnes Press, 1989. 362 pp.
Kark, R., ed. Redemption of the Land of Eretz-Israel: Ideology and Practice. Jerusalem: Yad Izhak Ben-Zvi Publications, 1990. 320 pp. (in Hebrew).
Kark, R., ed. Land and Settlement in Eretz Israel 1830–1990. Selected Papers by Prof. Ruth Kark. Jerusalem: The Land-Use Research Institute, 1995. 200 pp. (in Hebrew and English).  
Shilo, M., Kark, R. and Hasan-Rokem, G., eds., Jewish Women in the Yishuv and Zionism: A Gender Perspective, Jerusalem: Yad Izhak Ben-Zvi Press, 2001, 463 pp. (Hebrew).
Kark, R., Shilo, M. and Hasan-Rokem, G., Jewish Women in Pre-State Israel: Life History, Politics and Culture, Waltham, MA.: Brandeis University Press and Hanover, NH and London: University Press of New England (updated English version, 2008).

Awards and recognition
Professor Kark has received numerous scholarships and awards. These include the Jerusalem Bank award, a Fulbright scholarship (USA-Israel), and many more. In 2009, Kark and co-author Joseph Glass won an award for their research on the development of banking in Ottoman Palestine.

In 2013, Kark was awarded the Yakir Yerushalayim prize for her contributions to the city of Jerusalem. In 2014, she received the Herzl prize for her research on the settlement in Israel, and in 2016 she was awarded a recognition of gratitude award from the Israeli Geographical Society.

See also
Women of Israel

References

Hebrew University of Jerusalem alumni
Academic staff of the Hebrew University of Jerusalem
Israeli historians
Israeli women historians
Jewish historians
Historians of the Middle East
Historians of Israel
Living people
1941 births